Leumeah station is located on the Main South line, serving the Sydney suburb of Leumeah. It is served by Sydney Trains T8 Airport & South line services.

History
Leumeah station opened in 1886. The station is the main access station for Campbelltown Stadium, home of the A-League football team Macarthur_FC and the Wests Tigers National Rugby League team.

In 2012, an upgrade to the station including lifts was complete.

In January 2013, the Southern Sydney Freight Line opened to the west of the station.

Since the second half of 2017, Leumeah railway station has been served exclusively by the Airport and East Hills line, meaning commuters have to change at Glenfield to travel to either the city via Granville station or to Blacktown station via the Cumberland Line.

Platforms & services

Transport links

Busabout operate two routes via Leumeah station:
879: to Campbelltown station
881: Leumeah North to Campbelltown station

Interline Bus Services operate three routes via Leumeah station:
870: Campbelltown Hospital to Liverpool station
871: Campbelltown Hospital to Liverpool station
872: Campbelltown Hospital to Liverpool station

Leumeah station is served by one NightRide route:
N30: Macarthur station to Town Hall station

References

External links

Leumeah station details Transport for New South Wales

Easy Access railway stations in Sydney
Railway stations in Sydney
Railway stations in Australia opened in 1886
Leumeah, New South Wales
Main Southern railway line, New South Wales